Blessing is both a surname and a given name. Notable people with the name include:

Surname:
Donald Blessing, American coxswain
Karl Blessing, German banker
Lee Blessing, American playwright
Lou Blessing, American politician
Martin Blessing, German banker
Tom Blessing IV, American film and television producer

Given name:
Blessing Afrifah, Israeli track and field athlete
Blessing Chinedu, Nigerian football player
Blessing Chebundo, Zimbabwean politician
Blessing Kaku, Nigerian football player
Blessing Mahwire, Zimbabwean cricketer
Blessing Makunike, Zimbabwean football player
Blessing Oborududu (born 1989), Nigerian wrestler 
Blessing Okagbare, Nigerian athlete
Blessing Okardi, Nigerian football player